Old Hawleyton Methodist Episcopal Church is a historic Methodist Episcopal church located at Hawleyton in Broome County, New York.  It was constructed in 1856-1857 and altered in 1877 and 1942; the attached Fellowship Hall was constructed in two stages between 1950 and 1954.  The original structure was built as a small rectangular wood-frame building characterized by a steep gable roof with deeply hanging overhanging eaves in a rural Gothic Revival style.

It was listed on the National Register of Historic Places in 2006.

References

Churches in Broome County, New York
National Register of Historic Places in Broome County, New York
Churches on the National Register of Historic Places in New York (state)
Methodist churches in New York (state)
Churches completed in 1857
19th-century Methodist church buildings in the United States
1857 establishments in New York (state)